Eurico Surgey (23 October 1931 – 10 June 2018) was a Portuguese swimmer. He competed in the men's 100 metre backstroke at the 1952 Summer Olympics.

References

External links
 

1931 births
2018 deaths
Portuguese male backstroke swimmers
Olympic swimmers of Portugal
Swimmers at the 1952 Summer Olympics
Swimmers from Lisbon